Paper Dove is a 2003 Peruvian drama film directed by Fabrizio Aguilar. It was selected as the Peruvian entry for the Best Foreign Language Film at the 76th Academy Awards, but it was not nominated.

Cast
 Antonio Callirgos as Juan
 Eduardo Cesti as Viejo
 Aristóteles Picho as Fermin
 Liliana Trujillo as Domitila
 Sergio Galliani as Wilmer
 Melania Urbina as Yeni

See also
 List of submissions to the 76th Academy Awards for Best Foreign Language Film
 List of Peruvian submissions for the Academy Award for Best International Feature Film

References

External links
 

2003 films
2003 drama films
Peruvian drama films
2000s Peruvian films
2000s Spanish-language films